Christian "Mose" Kelsch (January 31, 1897 – July 13, 1935) was an American football placekicker and running back in the National Football League (NFL).  He was a charter member of the Pittsburgh Pirates (which would later be renamed the Steelers).

Kelsch grew up as an orphan in Pittsburgh's Troy Hill neighborhood.  He earned the nickname "Mose" while playing sandlot baseball, though no one was able to recall the circumstances that brought the name about. He played semi-professional football for several teams in the area, including the Hope-Harveys, James P. Rooneys and Majestic Radio teams managed by Art Rooney which would form the basis of the NFL's Pirates.

At the time he joined the newly formed Pirates in  Kelsch, at 36 years old, was the oldest player in the NFL. Even the Pirates' owner, Rooney, was four years his junior. He was used almost exclusively for his kicking ability, coming into the game to convert field goals and extra points. He may have been the first such "specialist" in the still-nascent NFL. He was also one of the few players in the league at the time who never played college football and listed the "School of Hard Knocks" as his alma mater whenever asked.

Kelsch never married. He died in an automobile accident on July 13, 1935.  Art Rooney served as a pall-bearer at his funeral.

References

1897 births
1935 deaths
American football running backs
American football placekickers
Pittsburgh Pirates (football) players
Road incident deaths in Pennsylvania
Players of American football from Pittsburgh